Amanat Lewana ( 1940s) was an Afghan politician who served as prime minister under Salemai, a king of Afghanistan who ruled only in the Eastern Province.

Background 

In either 1944 or 1945, the Safi tribe rose up against the government of the Kingdom of Afghanistan. According to British records, the uprising was caused by the Afghan government's attempts to institute conscription among the Safi, trading monopolies granted to Afghan merchant companies, and government surveillance. However, Whit Mason attributes the Safi uprising to "extremely brutal taxation, oppression and poverty". Among the more enthusiastic rebel fighters were younger men with more to gain and less to lose from fighting the government. The Afghan government extensively deployed its air force against the rebels, using aircraft to drop leaflets, gun down tribesmen and drop incendiary bombs.

Prime Minister 
Religious scholars among the Safi ruled that anyone who rebelled against their King and died should be excluded from being counted as martyrs. Therefore, they were required to select one of their own as king. According to Whit Mason's version of events in The Rule of Law in Afghanistan: Missing in Inaction (2011), in either 1944 or 1945, the Safi selected Shahswar as king, Salemai as prime minister and Amanul Mulk as minister of defence. However, Mason appears to mix up several roles. David B. Edwards, a veteran scholar of Afghan history, gives the following quote from Amanul Mulk (whom Edwards interviewed personally) in Caravan of Martyrs: Sacrifice and Suicide Bombing in Afghanistan (2017), which appears to confirm that Amanat Lewana was Prime Minister instead of Salemai:The Safi were ultimately defeated by the Afghan government.

References 

Year of birth missing
Year of death missing
20th-century Afghan politicians
Prime Ministers of Afghanistan
1940s in Afghanistan
Afghan rebels